Asterton is a hamlet in Shropshire, England in the civil parish of Myndtown. The name means "eastern home farm", from Old English east "east" and "ham" "home". It is thought to date back to early Saxon times. It is situated 4 miles south west of Church Stretton, 6 miles north west of Bishops Castle, 15 miles north west of Ludlow and 17 miles south of Shrewsbury, the county town of Shropshire. The nearest other settlements are Prolly Moor, Wentnor, Ratlinghope, Myndtown and Little Stretton.

The village is home to 40 residents in 13 houses.

It is well known for being at the foot of the long, steep and precipitous single lane road the runs down the western ridge of the Longmynd into the village. This road is often closed during spells of adverse weather in the winter and results in motorists facing a diversion via Plowden and Marshbrook before reaching Church Stretton. The Midland Gliding club is situated at the top of this road, above the village on the Longmynd.

See also
Listed buildings in Myndtown

External links

Hamlets in Shropshire